Chiodecton is a genus of lichens in the family Roccellaceae. The genus was circumscribed by lichenologist Erik Acharius in 1814, with Chiodecton sphaerale assigned as the type species.

Species
, Species Fungorum accepts 22 species in Chiodecton.
Chiodecton acarosporoides 
Chiodecton andamanicum  – India
Chiodecton applanatum  – Malaysia
Chiodecton colensoi 
Chiodecton complexum  – Brazil
Chiodecton congestulum 
Chiodecton effusum 
Chiodecton flavovirens 
Chiodecton graphidastroides 
Chiodecton heterogenum 
Chiodecton leprarioides  – Réunion
Chiodecton leptosporum 
Chiodecton lichexanthonicum 
Chiodecton macquariense 
Chiodecton maculatum 
Chiodecton montanum 
Chiodecton norsticticum  – India
Chiodecton pustuliferum 
Chiodecton queenslandiae 
Chiodecton sorediatum  – Uganda
Chiodecton sphaerale 
Chiodecton stictathecium 
Chiodecton sublaevigatum

References

Roccellaceae
Ascomycota genera
Lichen genera
Taxa named by Erik Acharius
Taxa described in 1814